Rhathymus is a genus of kleptoparasitic bees belonging to the family Apidae.

Species of this genus are found in South America.

Species
Rhathymus ater 
Rhathymus atitlanicus 
Rhathymus beebei 
Rhathymus bicolor 
Rhathymus concolor 
Rhathymus cristatus 
Rhathymus fulvus 
Rhathymus insignis 
Rhathymus michaelis 
Rhathymus nigripes 
Rhathymus paraguayensis 
Rhathymus quadriplagiatus 
Rhathymus rufescens 
Rhathymus scoliaeformis 
Rhathymus trinitatis 
Rhathymus unicolor 
Rhathymus vespiformis

References

Apidae